Mimosybra is a genus of beetles in the family Cerambycidae, containing the following species:

 Mimosybra alternans Breuning, 1973
 Mimosybra baloghi Breuning, 1975
 Mimosybra basigranosa Breuning, 1939
 Mimosybra bimaculata Breuning, 1973
 Mimosybra bipunctata Breuning, 1951
 Mimosybra carinipennis Breuning, 1940
 Mimosybra continentalis Breuning, 1965
 Mimosybra discreta (Pascoe, 1865)
 Mimosybra fergussoni Breuning, 1970
 Mimosybra flavomaculata Breuning, 1964
 Mimosybra gebeensis Breuning, 1961
 Mimosybra kaszabi Breuning, 1975
 Mimosybra laevicollis Breuning, 1939
 Mimosybra latefasciata Breuning, 1963
 Mimosybra mediomaculata Breuning, 1939
 Mimosybra negrosensis Breuning, 1970
 Mimosybra paraspinipennis Breuning, 1977
 Mimosybra postlineata Hüdepohl, 1995
 Mimosybra salomonum Breuning, 1939
 Mimosybra samarensis Breuning, 1970
 Mimosybra schultzei (Breuning, 1966)
 Mimosybra similis Breuning, 1975
 Mimosybra spinipennis Breuning, 1975
 Mimosybra surigaonis (Heller, 1924)
 Mimosybra triguttata (Aurivillius, 1927)
 Mimosybra trimaculata Breuning, 1953
 Mimosybra uniformis Breuning, 1939

References

 
Cerambycidae genera